Birds of a feather flock together is an English proverb. The meaning is that beings (typically humans) of similar type, interest, personality, character, or other distinctive attribute tend to mutually associate.

The idiom is sometimes spoken or written as an anapodoton, where only the first part ("Birds of a feather") is given and the second part ("...flock together") is implied, as, for example "The whole lot of them are thick as thieves; well, birds of a feather, you know" (this requires the reader or listener to be familiar with the idiom).

Origin

Nature
In nature, birds of the same species in flight often form homogeneous groups for various reasons, such as to defend against predators. This behavior of birds has been observed by people since time immemorial, and is the source of the idiom ("of a feather" means "of the same plumage," that is, of the same species).

Hebrew and Greek literature
The first known written instance of metaphorical use of the flocking behavior of birds is found in the second century BC, where Ben Sira uses it in his apocryphal Biblical Book of Ecclesiasticus, written about 180–175 BC. This was translated into Greek sometime after 117 BC (probably), and it is this Greek version that has commonly been used, even in the Septuagint used by diaspora Jews.

Verse 27:9 of this Greek version of Sira's Hebrew original is 

Richard Challoner's 1752 version of the Douay–Rheims Bible translates this as

Other renderings give "Birds roost with their own kind, so honesty comes home to those who practice it" (New Revised Standard Version Catholic Edition, 1989), "Birds nest with their own kind, and honesty comes to those who work at it" (New American Bible Revised Edition, 2011), and so forth.

First English uses
The first known use of the idiom in original English writing is 1545, when William Turner used a version of it in his anti-Catholic satire "The Rescuing of the Papist Fox":

Which may be rendered in 21st century English as

John Minsheu's The Dictionarie in Spanish and English (1599) has "Birdes of a feather will flocke togither". Philemon Holland's 1600 translation of Livy's Ab Urbe Condita Libri has "As commonly birds of a feather will flye together", while Dryden's 1697 translation The Works of Virgil: Containing His Pastorals, Georgics, and Aeneis ascribes flocking behavior to humans: "What place the gods for our repose assigned / Friends daily flock..."

Benjamin Jowett's translation Plato's 360 BC Republic, published in 1856 and in use since, has "Men of my age flock together; we are birds of a feather, as the old proverb says".

Plato's original is:

Jowett gives this as:

However, Jowett here is taking a liberty in rendering Plato's phrase into idiomatic English of his time; the Greek original has nothing about birds, and it is not known what "old proverb" is referred to. Other translations dispense with the bird reference, hewing more closely to the original text: Allan Bloom's 1968 translation of the passage has "By Zeus, I shall tell you just how it looks to me, Socrates, he said. Some of us who are about the same age often meet together and keep up the old proverb."

Use in literature
The idiom appears occasionally in the literary canon, both in English and translations from other languages.

Swift's poem "A Conference, Between Sir Harry Pierce's Chariot, And Mrs. D. Stopford's Chair" (c. 1710) has "And since we're so near, like birds of a feather / Let's e'en, as they say, set our horses together", while Anthony Trollope in The Prime Minister (1876) has "'They're birds of a feather,' said Lopez. 'Birds of a feather do fall out sometimes'...", and James Joyce in Ulysses (1922) has "I have more than once observed that birds of a feather laugh together." Tolstoy's War and Peace (1869, first translated into English in 1899) has "...so that birds of a feather may fight together" (that is, on the same side). (A Russian proverb with similar meaning is одного поля ягоды ("bones from the same field")

Equivalent phrases in other languages
In Chinese, a form similar to anapodoton, called xiehouyu ("a saying with the latter part suspended"), is a folk tradition. One xiehouyu of similar meaning to "birds of a feather...", and which may be idiomatically translated as that, is 物以類聚, "Similar things collect...", where the second part (人以群分, "...similar people also") is left unsaid and implied.

A similar proverb in Japanese is 目の寄る所へ玉が寄る, literally "where the eyes go, the eyeballs follow" but with an understood idiomatic meaning of "like draws like", which can be translated into idiomatic English as "birds of a feather flock together", as may the Japanese saying 類は友を呼ぶ, "similar calls a friend."

In Swedish "lika barn leka bäst" ("children that are alike play the best [together]") is also sometimes translated into idiomatic English as "birds of a feather flock together."

References

Metaphors referring to birds
English-language idioms